Florian Haut-Labourdette (born 4 October 1992) is a French rally co-driver. He is the co-driver of the French rally driver Pierre-Louis Loubet, racing for Hyundai 2C Competition in the World Rally Championship.

Rally career
Haut-Labourdette made his WRC debut at the 2012 Monte Carlo Rally. He is set to co-drive with Pierre-Louis Loubet at the 2021 Rally de Portugal, replacing Vincent Landais.

Rally results

WRC results
 
* Season still in progress.

References

External links
 Florian Haut-Labourdette's e-wrc profile

1992 births
Living people
French rally co-drivers
World Rally Championship co-drivers